Zanthoxylum mezoneurispinosum, synonym Fagara mezoneurispinosa, is a species of plant in the family Rutaceae. It is endemic to lowland tropical rainforests of Ivory Coast.

References

 

mezoneurispinosum
Endemic flora of Ivory Coast
Endangered flora of Africa
Taxonomy articles created by Polbot